KUAO may refer to:

 KUAO (FM), a radio station (88.7 FM) licensed to serve North Ogden, Utah, United States
 KNKL (FM), a radio station (88.1 FM) licensed to serve Tremonton, Utah, which held the call sign KUAO from 2017 to 2019
 Aurora State Airport (ICAO code KUAO)